Chamarajanagar or Chamarajanagara is the southernmost district in the state of Karnataka, India. It was carved out of the original larger Mysore District in 1998. Chamarajanagar town is the headquarters of this district.

It is the third least populous district in Karnataka (out of 30), after Kodagu and Bangalore Rural.

History
Chamarajanagar was earlier known as Sri Arikottara. Chamaraja Wodeyar, the Wodeyar of Mysuru was born here and hence this place was renamed after him. The Vijaya Parsvanath Basadi, a holy Jain shrine was constructed by Punisadandanayaka, the commander of the Hoysala king Gangaraja in the year 1117 AD.

Geography
Being the southernmost district of Karnataka, Chamarajanagar district borders the state of Tamil Nadu and Kerala. Specifically, it borders Mysore district of Karnataka to the west and north, Mandya and Ramanagara districts of Karnataka to the north-east, Dharmapuri and Krishnagiri districts of Tamil Nadu to the east, Salem to south-east, Erode districts and Nilgiris district of Tamil Nadu to the south, and to the extreme south-west, there is a very small border with Wayanad district of Kerala.

Most of the district lies in the leeward region of the Nilgiris and consists of mainly semi-arid rain-dependent flatlands along with forested hills.

Roads
Three national highways of India pass through Chamarajanagara district namely NH-766, NH-181, and NH-948. Some state highways of Karnataka pass through this district.

National Highway 948 ( previously NH 209), which starts from Bengaluru in Karnataka state and ends at Coimbatore in Tamil Nadu, passes through the following places namely Kanakapura, Malavalli, Kollegal, Chamarajanagar, Punajanur and enters Tamil Nadu.It further goes to Hasanur, Dhimbam ghat, Thalamalai, Bannari, Satyamangalam, Pullampatti, Annur ends at Coimbatore. Few KSRTC buses run on NH 948. There are many roads from Chamarajanagara district to neighbouring taminadu state. One road connects Kollegal to Hasanur via Dhondenling and Germalam. There is a buddhist monastery at Dhondeling. Another road connects Kollegala to Anthiyur via Hanur, Ramapura, Burgur and Moongilpalya. The road from Kollegala to Mettur goes through Hanur Kowdalli( Cowdalli), Male Mahadeshwara Betta( MM Hills), Palar, Govindapadi, Kaveripuram and Kolathur. The above-mentioned three roads pass through forest teeming with wild animals, including elephants, Indian Bison, leopards and tigers. These roads are isolated and narrow at many stretches without any human habitation or cellular phone signals.

National Highway 181 connects Gundlupete town of Chamarajanagara district with Ooty via Bandipura and Gudalur. National Highway 766 connects Gundlupete with Kalpetta via Mulehole and Sulthan bathery. The national highways 181 and 766 are closed for private vehicles at night in stretch between Gundlupete and neighbouring states.. Only state government buses are allowed at night in these section of highway.

Demographics
According to the 2011 census Chamarajanagar district has a population of 1,020,791, roughly equal to the nation of Cyprus or the US state of Montana. This gives it a ranking of 441st in India (out of a total of 640). Its population growth rate over the decade 2001-2011 was 5.75%.	Chamarajanagar	has a sex ratio of 	989	females for every 1000 males, and a literacy rate of 61.43%. Scheduled Castes and Scheduled Tribes make up 25.42% and 11.78% of the population respectively.

The district has a high percentage of Scheduled Castes, with a population of 259,000, making up a quarter of the district's population. Having a large percentage of forest cover the district also has a high population of tribals, mostly the Nayakas but also forest tribes like the Soligas, Yeravas, Jenu Kurubas and Betta Kurubas. These tribals have their own languages and their total population is around 120,000, and make up 12% of the district population. Other communities include Lingayats, Muslims and Vokkaligas.

At the time of the 2011 census, 86.10% of the population spoke Kannada, 4.58% Tamil, 4.42% Urdu and 3.29% Telugu as their first language.

Crime 

Since much of the southern area of the district is dense forest, it provided good refuge to the notorious bandit Veerappan, responsible for the death of over a hundred policemen in both states of Karnataka and Tamil Nadu. He was shot dead in an encounter with the specially formed Special Task Force (STF) on 18 October 2004, in Dharmapuri district, Tamil Nadu. He had been on the run for over two decades. The presence of illegal quarrying for black stone imposes a great threat to the forests in the region.

Tourist attractions
The main tourist attractions are Sri Chamarajeshwara temple in Chamarajanagar, Biligiriranga Hills, K Gudi, Male Mahadeshwara Hills, Gundal dam, Suvarnavati dam, Hogenakal Falls, Shivasamudram, Bandipur national park, Gopalaswamy Hills in Gundlupet and many.

Notable people 
 Dr.Rajkumar - actor
Samsa - first historical playwright in Modern Kannada 
 B. Rachaiah - politician
B. S. Madhava Rao - mathematical physicist
 Nanjaiah Honganuru - noted folklorist and writer
 Mudnakudu Chinnaswamy - poet
 R. Dhruvanarayana - politician
 S. Mahendar - filmmaker
 Avinash - actor 
 S.M. Siddaiah - lawyer and politician
 Srinivasa Prasad - politician

References

External links

 Official website
 Maps Of India - Map of Chamarajanagar district

 
Districts of Karnataka
1998 establishments in Karnataka